Casper Henningsen (born July 6, 1985) is the CEO of UserTribe. Henningsen was previously a Danish professional football player who played at Silkeborg in the Danish Superliga.

Career

Soccer
Henningsen began his soccer career in 2000 when he joined F.C. Copenhagen’s youth team at 15 years old. In 2006 he turned pro when he moved to Silkeborg IF.  Henningsen played professionally for six years, transferring to Brønshøj BK before retiring in 2012.

Commercial
In 2010, Henningsen began his transition into the commercial world, working full time at Mindjumpers while also playing soccer full time. Henningsen officially retired from soccer in 2012 when he joined Kunde & Co. In 2015 he became, at age 30, the youngest ever managing partner there.

Henningsen joined UserTribe in 2017 as their Chief Commercial Officer and overtook the CEO role from Jonas Alexandersson in 2018.

References

External links
Career statistics at Danmarks Radio

1985 births
Living people
Danish men's footballers
Association football midfielders
Silkeborg IF players
Akademisk Boldklub players
People from Korsør
Sportspeople from Region Zealand